In enzymology, a L-glycol dehydrogenase is an enzyme that catalyzes the chemical reaction

an L-glycol + NAD(P)+  a 2-hydroxycarbonyl compound + NAD(P)H + H+

The 3 substrates of this enzyme are L-glycol, NAD+, and NADP+, whereas its 4 products are 2-hydroxycarbonyl compound, NADH, NADPH, and H+.

This enzyme belongs to the family of oxidoreductases, specifically those acting on the CH-OH group of donor with NAD+ or NADP+ as acceptor. The systematic name of this enzyme class is L-glycol:NAD(P)+ oxidoreductase. Other names in common use include glycol (nicotinamide adenine dinucleotide (phosphate)), dehydrogenase, L-(+)-glycol:NAD(P)+ oxidoreductase, and L-glycol:NAD(P)+ dehydrogenase.

References

 

EC 1.1.1
NADPH-dependent enzymes
NADH-dependent enzymes
Enzymes of unknown structure